Goodbye (also called Goodbye Cream) is the fourth and final studio album by Cream, with three tracks recorded live, and three recorded in the studio. It was released in Europe by Polydor Records and by Atco Records in the United States, debuting in Billboard on 15 February 1969. It reached number one in the United Kingdom and number two in the United States. A single, "Badge", was subsequently released from the album a month later. The album was released after Cream disbanded in November 1968.

Background and recording 
Just before Cream's third album, Wheels of Fire, was to be released, the group's manager Robert Stigwood announced that the group were going to disband after a farewell tour and a final concert at the Royal Albert Hall in November. Just before the start of their farewell tour in October 1968, Cream recorded three songs at IBC Studios in London with producer Felix Pappalardi and engineer Damon Lyon-Shaw. The songs "Badge" and "Doing That Scrapyard Thing" featured Eric Clapton using a Leslie speaker, while all three recordings featured keyboard instruments played by either Jack Bruce or Felix Pappalardi. The group started their farewell tour on 4 October 1968 in Oakland, California and 15 days later on 19 October the group performed at The Forum in Los Angeles where the three live recordings on Goodbye were recorded with Felix Pappalardi and engineers Adrian Barber and Bill Halverson.

Compiling, artwork, and packaging 
The original plan for Goodbye was to make it a double album, with one disc featuring studio recordings and the other with live performances like Wheels of Fire. With a lack of quality material on hand, however, the album was only one disc with three live recordings and three studio recordings.

The original LP release of the album was packaged in a gatefold sleeve with art direction handled by Haig Adishian. The outer sleeve featured photography by Roger Phillips with a cover design by the Alan Aldridge ink Studios, while the inner sleeve featured an illustration of a cemetery by Roger Hane that had the song titles on tombstones. A Compact Disc reissue of the album for the Cream Remasters series in 1998 featured an inlay photograph and had the inner-sleeve illustration in the liner notes of the album.

Critical reception 

In a contemporary review for Rolling Stone, music critic Ray Rezos felt Cream deserved to depart with a better album. He wrote that most of the live songs sounded inferior to the original recordings and that the studio tracks were marred by the same flaw as on Wheels of Fire, namely the presence of blues playing on songs whose compositions were not blues in his opinion. Nonetheless, Goodbye was voted the 148th best rock album of all time in Paul Gambaccini's 1978 poll of 50 prominent American and English rock critics.

In a retrospective review for AllMusic, senior editor Stephen Thomas Erlewine called Goodbye a work of "hard, heavy rock" and "strong moments" rather than cohesiveness, with live music that is generally better than on Wheels of Fire and a side of studio recordings that also found Cream "at something of a peak". Robert Christgau also reacted favourably to the album, citing it as his favorite record from the group. J. D. Considine was less impressed in The Rolling Stone Album Guide (1992), deeming Goodbye an incomplete record with "exquisite studio work" but mediocre live performances.

Track listing 

 Sides one and two were combined as tracks 1–6 on CD reissues.

Notes:
 [1–3] recorded live at The Forum, Los Angeles, 19 October 1968.
 Original pressings of the album (as well as the single) list composer credit on "Badge" to Clapton alone.
 "Anyone for Tennis" was originally released as a non-album single, as well as by Atco on the soundtrack album to the film The Savage Seven (catalogue no. SD 33-245, 1968). The song was subsequently sometimes included on pressings of Wheels of Fire (1968) and later pressings of Goodbye by Polydor.

Personnel 
Cream

 Eric Claptonguitars , lead vocals  backing vocals 
 Jack Brucebass guitar , lead vocals , piano , organ 
 Ginger Bakerdrums , backing vocals , percussion 

Additional musicians

 L'Angelo Misterioso (George Harrison)rhythm guitar 
Felix Pappalardipiano , mellotron , bass 

Recording

 EngineersBill Halverson, Adrian Barber, Damon Lyon-Shaw

Charts

Certifications

References 

1969 albums
Cream (band) albums
Polydor Records albums
Atco Records albums
1969 live albums
Polydor Records live albums
Atco Records live albums
Albums produced by Felix Pappalardi
Albums recorded at the Forum
Albums recorded at IBC Studios
Albums with cover art by Alan Aldridge